Nagele or Nägele may refer to:
 Nagele, village in the Dutch province of Flevoland
 Nägele Palace, historical monument in the Fabric district of Timișoara, Romania

People with the name
 Edmund Nägele, German photographer
 Elisabeth Nagele (1933–1993), Swiss luger 
 Hans Nägele (1884–1973), Austrian journalist and author of non-fiction books and folklorist
 Johannes Nagele (born 1964), Austrian fencer
 Julia Nagele (born 1971), American designer and educator
 Olivier Nägele (born 1972), Liechtenstein born ski mountaineer
 Rainer Nägele (1943–2022), American literary scholar

See also 
 Nagle (disambiguation)
 Negele (disambiguation)
 Nagel (disambiguation)

Surnames of German origin
Surnames of Austrian origin
Surnames of Swiss origin
Surnames of Liechtenstein origin